Letter value or value of the letter may refer to:

Phonetic value of the letter
Numeric value of a letter from the alphabet in some numeric systems 
Numeric value of a letter in Scrabble and some other word games